Suomen Luonto (meaning Nature of Finland in English) is Finland's largest nature magazine. It is headquartered in Helsinki, Finland.

History and profile
Suomen Luonto was established in 1941. The magazine is published by Suomen luonnonsuojeluliitto (The Finnish Association for Nature Conservation).

Suomen Luonto, based in Helsinki, deals with current topics in nature and environment and delivers both news and in-depth articles about Finnish nature and also international subjects. It contains English language abstracts. The magazine is also available in public libraries. The editor-in-chief is Heikki Vasamies. The magazine appears ten times a year.

The circulation of Suomen Luonto was 25,000 copies in 2012.

See also
List of magazines in Finland

References

External links
 Official website

1941 establishments in Finland
Environmental magazines
Finnish-language magazines
Magazines established in 1941
Magazines published in Helsinki
Monthly magazines published in Finland